The 2005–06 Kentucky Wildcats men's basketball team represented University of Kentucky. The head coach was Tubby Smith. The team was a member of the Southeastern Conference and played their home games at Rupp Arena.

Incoming signees

Roster

2005–06 Schedule and Results

|-
!colspan=9 style="background:#273BE2; color:white;"| Non-conference regular season

|-
!colspan=9 style="background:#273BE2; color:white;"| SEC Regular Season

|-
!colspan=9 style="background:#273BE2;"| 2006 SEC Tournament

|-
!colspan=9 style="background:#273BE2;"| 2006 NCAA Tournament

NCAA basketball tournament
East
Kentucky (#8 seed) 69, UAB (#9 seed) 64
Connecticut (#1 seed) 87, Kentucky 83

Team players drafted into the NBA

See also
Kentucky Wildcats men's basketball
2006 NCAA Division I men's basketball tournament

References

External links

Kentucky Wildcats
Kentucky Wildcats men's basketball seasons
Kentucky Wildcats men's basketball
Kentucky Wildcats men's basketball
Kentucky